Muslim Umar (born June 7, 2003) is a Canadian soccer player who plays for the University of Portland men's soccer team.

Early life
Born in the Nigerian capital of Lagos, Umar and his family emigrated to Canada and settled in Edmonton when he was young. He played youth soccer with Edmonton Internazionale SC and BTB Academy, later moving on to the academies of FC Edmonton and Vancouver Whitecaps FC. In July 2021, Umar was selected by German football giants Bayern Munich to be a part of their world squad to compete in friendlies around the world.

Club career
In September 2021, Umar joined Canadian Premier League club FC Edmonton and made an appearance on the bench in a game against Valour FC on September 7.

Later in the month, on September 23 fellow CPL side York United announced Umar had joined the team on a developmental contract until the end of the season. He made his professional debut on November 9 against Forge FC. In December 2021 York announced that Umar's deal had ended and that he would return to his youth club.

References

2003 births
Living people
Canadian people of Nigerian descent
Canadian soccer players
Nigerian footballers
Association football forwards
Vancouver Whitecaps Residency players
FC Edmonton players
York United FC players
Canadian Premier League players
Portland Pilots men's soccer players
Canadian expatriate soccer players
Expatriate soccer players in the United States
Canadian expatriate sportspeople in the United States